Rewrapped is a reality cooking television show hosted by Joey Fatone that premiered on April 21, 2014, on Food Network. Similar to short-form cooking reality shows, it features three chefs challenged to first recreate a classic snack food, then innovate a totally new dish using said snack food as the main ingredient. The show is a loose spinoff of the show Unwrapped, whose host Marc Summers acts as "Head Judge" for each episode, alongside a representative of the company that produces the food of the day, and a third impartial judge involved in the food industry in some way (chef, critic, blogger, etc.).

On the premiere week, two new episodes of the 30-minute series aired Monday nights at 8:00 pm and 8:30 pm ET. Up to May 5, 2014, one new episode aired in the 8:00 slot, with a repeat episode at 8:30 pm. As of May 12, 2014, a single new episode airs in the Monday 8:00 pm slot, followed by an episode of Unwrapped at 8:30 pm.

Rewrapped returned for its second season on September 8, 2014, still airing in its 8:00 pm EST Monday slot, and once again followed by an encore episode of Rewrapped at 8:30 pm EST.

Format

Each episode of Rewrapped features three chefs undergoing two cooking challenges. After dishes are prepared, the three judges evaluate each dish, scoring them on a scale of 1 to 10. This makes for a possible score range of 3 (lowest) to 30 (highest).

Like its parent show Unwrapped, each episode features short segments on the creation & packaging of the food of the day.

Round 1: Recreate

The three chefs are given 30 minutes to try and replicate the exact snack food from scratch. In the case of food items with a specific shape, the chefs must bring their own "molds" to use to try and duplicate the appearance of the food. The chef's attempts are judged on taste, appearance, and how closely they replicated the original food. In season 1, no eliminations took place in this round, but starting in season 2, the chef with the lowest score is eliminated from the competition.

Round 2: Innovate

The chefs (all 3 in season 1; the remaining 2 in season 2) are given another 30 minutes to use the food of the day as the main ingredient in their own original dish. The chefs are supplied with enough of the original food to use in their dishes. In this round, taste, appearance and originality are the key factors in the judge's scores.

In season 1, the scores from both rounds are totalled, and the chef with the highest combined score won. For season 2, both remaining chefs are scored only for the Innovate round to determine the winner. In both cases, the winner of the episode receives a year's supply of the snack food.

Episodes

Season 1

Season 2

References

External links
 

2010s American cooking television series
2014 American television series debuts
English-language television shows
Cooking competitions in the United States
Food Network original programming